United Nations Security Council resolution 728, adopted unanimously on 8 January 1992, after recalling resolutions 668 (1990), 717 (1991) and 718 (1991), the Council welcomed the implementation by all parties of the agreement in Paris on 23 October 1991, but expressed concern at the existence of land mines in Cambodia.

The Council noted the establishment of a mine-awareness programme by a report of the Secretary-General in Resolution 717, and that the agreements allow the United Nations Transitional Authority in Cambodia to assist in the process of demining and to undertake training programmes. It also requested the Supreme National Council of Cambodia to co-operate with the United Nations Advance Mission in Cambodia with its expanded mandate of demining and training the local population, and again called upon all parties to observe the ceasefire.

See also
 List of United Nations Security Council Resolutions 701 to 800 (1991–1993)
 Modern Cambodia
 Transition of the People's Republic of Kampuchea to Cambodia

References

External links
 
Text of the Resolution at undocs.org

 0728
20th century in Cambodia
Political history of Cambodia
 0728
January 1992 events
1992 in Cambodia